International Superstar is a double compilation album and the 42nd overall album by country singer Johnny Cash, released on Columbia Records in 1972 (see 1972 in music). It is a collection of previously released material, including hit singles like "A Thing Called Love" and "The One on the Right Is on the Left".

Track listing

Charts
Singles - Billboard (United States)

External links
 Luma Electronic's Johnny Cash discography listing

1972 compilation albums
Johnny Cash albums
Columbia Records albums